The SPCA 30, also known as SPCA Type III, was a French bomber aircraft built by the Société Provençale de Constructions Aéronautiques (SPCA).

Development and design

In 1928, the French Service Technique de l'Aéronautique (the government body responsible for producing specifications for aircraft for the Frech armed forces) drew up requirements for a four-seat Multiplace de Combat, a multi-role aircraft capable of day and night bombing, reconnaissance and long–range escort duties. In response, SPCA designed an all-metal twin boom low wing monoplane, the SPCA 30, the only twin boom aircraft entered into the contest. The aircraft's central fuselage had two open cockpits offset to port, and a machine gun mount in the nose, while two more machine gun mounts were in the tailbooms. 

Two prototypes were completed late in 1930. The first one, registration F-AKCA was fitted with two  Lorraine-Dietrich 18Kd water-cooled W engines engines, and made its first flight on 1 February 1931. On 7 August, F-AKCA was being demonstrated at Villacoublay airfield when the aircraft suffered severe vibration when the engines were brought back to full power, with the tailbooms being displaced by more than a metre, leading to tearing of the skin of the aircraft's tailbooms. Despite the damage, the pilot managed to land the aircraft. The accident was eventually found to be due to flutter, caused by weakness of the wings in torsion (i.e. twisting), which was exacerbated by the unbalanced control surfaces. The second prototype, F-AKCB, with two 650 hp Hispano-Suiza 12Nb engines, flew on 6 May 1933. The original bulky landing gear was later replaced by a lighter one.

Operational history
The SPCA 30, together with other competing aircraft such as the Blériot 137 and the Breguet 410, were rejected in favour of Amiot's proposal, the Amiot 140, which later entered production as a 5-seat night bomber, the Amiot 143.

Specifications

See also

References

External links

Picture
Airspot (in Russian)
Bombardement Reconnaissance - unités à identifier

1930s French bomber aircraft
SPCA aircraft
Twin-boom aircraft
Low-wing aircraft
Aircraft first flown in 1931
Twin piston-engined tractor aircraft